Marudhamalai, also Maruthamalai or Marudamalai, is a suburb of Coimbatore in Tamil Nadu, India. It is located along the Western Ghats,  from Coimbatore. It is currently part of 17th ward of Coimbatore Corporation. It was part of Periyanaickenpalayam village panchayat before merging with Coimbatore Municipal Corporation. The suburb houses the famous Maruthamalai Marudhachalamurthy Temple, campuses of Bharathiar University and the Government Law College, Coimbatore. It is from VadaValli.

The Murugan Temple located here is considered to be the seventh abode of Lord Murugan. This temple is about 1200 years old and is under the patronage of Arunagirinathar with Thiruppugal. There are references to this temple in the inscriptions in the temple at Thirumuruganpoondi. Adjacent to the temple is the Pambatti Siddhar Cave Temple. Like other temples dedicated to Lord Murugan, the Marudhamalai Temple is located on the top of a hill in the Western Ghats

References 

Suburbs of Coimbatore
Cities and towns in Coimbatore district